Ab Bid-e Doshman Ziari (also Romanized as Āb Bīd-e Doshman Zīārī; also known as Āb Bīd and Darreh Āb Bīd) is a village in Doshman Ziari Rural District, Doshman Ziari District, Mamasani County, Fars Province, Iran. At the 2006 census, its population was 338, in 89 families.

References 

Populated places in Mamasani County